Taff's Well is a semi-rural village, community and electoral ward located at the south easterly tip of Rhondda Cynon Taf,  to the north of Cardiff, the capital city of Wales. Known locally as the 'Gates to the Valleys', it is separated from Gwaelod Y Garth by the River Taff. Taff's Well is distinguished because it contains the only thermal spring in Wales. The tepid water is thought to rise along a fault-line from the Carboniferous Limestone, in somewhat similar manner to the warm springs at Bristol and Bath. Various religious groups regard it as a spiritual site.

The Garth Mountain overlooks the village and was the inspiration for the fictional "Ffynnon Garw", featured in the book, and film The Englishman Who Went Up a Hill But Came Down a Mountain.

Name
The name "Taff's Well" is derived from the situation of the village alongside the River Taff and the presence of the warm spring within Taff's Well Park.

Thermal spring

Taff's Well Park (Parc Ffynnon Taf) is the site of the Taff's Well Thermal Spring, a well that reached its height of popularity for visitors to the village in the mid to late 1800s. The average temperature of the water is 21.6 degrees C. The Well at Taff's Well is Wales' only natural thermal spa.

Location
Taff's Well is situated just off Junction 32 of the M4 Motorway and at the southern end of the A470.

Though administered by Rhondda Cynon Taff Council, Taff's Well is a commuter town for the City of Cardiff where many of its residents work.

Culture

19th century 
Taff's Well grew into an important railway junction during the mid- to late nineteenth century, when Cardiff was a major global exporter of coal.

Taff's Well is a growing community which includes numerous districts: Glan-Y-Llyn, Rhiw Ddar and Glan Y-Fordd; Ty-Rhillage centre that consists of Alfred's terrace, Anchor Street, Church Street, Garth Street, Yew Street and Ty Rhiw through which the Taff Trail runs. Taff's Well is next to Castell Coch, which overlooks Cardiff.

20th century 
The actor David Jason spent much time in Taff's Well and based the situation comedy Open All Hours upon Arthur's shop which is one of many buildings to have been dismantled and sent to the St Fagan's Museum of Welsh Life.

21st century 
Taff's Well is the original location of the story that inspired the film The Englishman Who Went Up a Hill But Came Down a Mountain, by Ivor Monger and Christopher Monger.

Taff's Well has featured in the Sky sitcom Stella, starring Ruth Jones. The post office in Nantgarw is a filming location in the sitcom, although it is just outside the village.

Local politics

RCT Council Representative for Taff's Well 
Taff's Well is an electoral ward coterminous to the community boundaries and elects a county councillor to Rhondda Cynon Taf County Borough Council. Jill Bonetto (Labour) has represented the ward since 2012.

Taff's Well Community Council 
Taff's Well and Nantgarw are also represented locally by the Taff's Well & Nantgarw Community Council, which has 10 members. The Council hit the headlines in 2010 when it was criticised by the Wales Audit Office for breaching financial and corporate governance regulations with its financial records. Described as 'The Worst Run Council in Wales', there were calls for the 'wholesale sacking' of the ten members for breaching 'financial and corporate governance regulations because of its "inadequate" financial records, supporting paperwork and minutes between 2002 and 2006'.

Sport
Taff's Well A.F.C. are the local football team. They currently play in the Cymru South, the second tier of the Welsh football league system.

Taff's Well RFC are the local Rugby union team. (Producing 3 British and Irish Lions)

Transport
Taffs Well railway station, which opened in 1863, is situated on the Rhondda and Merthyr Lines. Services are provided by Transport for Wales northbound to Treherbert, Aberdare, Merthyr Tydfil via Pontypridd and southbound to Cardiff Queen Street and Cardiff Central. The average journey time to Cardiff Central is 20 minutes at a frequency of 6 trains per hour.

Stagecoach South Wales bus service 132 between Maerdy and Cardiff Central bus station stops in the village every 15 minutes at peak times.

The A470 road runs through the village between Cardiff Bay ( south) and Llandudno ( north).

There are plans to integrate Taff's Well into the South Wales Metro.

The former Walnut Tree Viaduct ran across the Taff Valley to the south of Taff's Well. Two of the support columns remain standing.

Churches
Taff's Well has two active churches:

 The Anglican church of St Mary and St James dates from 1879 and is located on Church Street. It is a chapel of ease to St Michael's in Tongwynlais. The minister is Rev Zoe King.
 The Nonconformist Taff's Well United Church is located on Cardiff Road. It was founded as a Wesleyan Methodist chapel and took on its current name when it merged with the Taff's Well Baptist Church in the late 20th century. The minister is Rev Cathy Gale.

Like the neighbouring community of Tongwynlais, Taff's Well formerly had a number of other churches which have ceased to function and have either been converted into other purposes or been demolished:

 The Tabor Calvinistic Methodist Church was built on what became Tabor Street in 1843. It was rebuilt in 1864.

 The Glandwr Taf Welsh Independent Chapel was built in 1859. It was modified in 1898 (or 1895) and was rebuilt in 1905, being capable of seating 250. It is now a private residence.
 The Tabernacle English Baptist Chapel on the corner of Garth and King Streets was built in 1906. Its congregation later merged to form Taff's Well United Church. After the merge, the chapel was demolished and the site is now occupied by housing.
 The Glan-Y-Llyn Gospel Hall formerly stood on Stradmore Close. It closed in January 2017 and the site has been redeveloped.

Cemetery
Ty Rhiw cemetery in Taff's Well was one of several cemeteries in Rhondda Cynon Taf where bodies were buried in the wrong graves. The errors were discovered in the early 2000s and resulted in a police investigation. In 2009 Taffs Well and Nantgarw Community Council planned to reuse the chapel at the cemetery for weddings and funerals, as was originally intended. A campaign against the decision was led by the Friends of Ty Rhiw Cemetery. There are seven Commonwealth War Graves Commission memorials in the cemetery, marking the burial place of British sailors and soldiers from the First and Second World War.

Gallery

Notable people
See :Category:People from Taff's Well

References

Spa towns in Wales
Communities in Rhondda Cynon Taf
Villages in Rhondda Cynon Taf
Wards of Rhondda Cynon Taf